Tazieff Rocks is a nunatak in Antarctica 0.8 nautical miles (1.5 km) southeast of Micou Point, Ross Island. It rises to c. at the south end of Endeavour Piedmont Glacier. At the suggestion of P.R. Kyle, it is named by the Advisory Committee on Antarctic Names (US-ACAN) after Haroun Tazieff (d.), a renowned French volcanologist who worked at Mount Erebus with several groups of French scientists in three field seasons between 1973 and 1979.

Nunataks of Ross Island